Yoann Tribeau (born February 26, 1988 in Villeneuve-Saint-Georges) is a French professional footballer who plays as an attacking midfielder for Ayia Napa FC in the Cypriot First Division.

Career
Tribeau joined Ayia Napa FC on 16 July 2019.

References

External links
 Career summary by playerhistory.com

1988 births
Living people
Sportspeople from Villeneuve-Saint-Georges
French footballers
French expatriate footballers
Ligue 2 players
Championnat National players
Angers SCO players
Calais RUFC players
Luzenac AP players
AS Beauvais Oise players
AS Cherbourg Football players
US Créteil-Lusitanos players
Othellos Athienou F.C. players
Alki Oroklini players
Ayia Napa FC players
Association football midfielders
Olympiakos Nicosia players
Cypriot First Division players
Cypriot Second Division players
Expatriate footballers in Cyprus
French expatriate sportspeople in Cyprus
Footballers from Val-de-Marne